Abductor digiti minimi (or Abductor digiti quinti) may refer to:
 Abductor digiti minimi muscle of hand
 Abductor digiti minimi muscle of foot